Besedino is a rural locality and the administrative center of Besedinsky Selsoviet Rural Settlement, Kursky District, Kursk Oblast, Russia. Population:

Geography 
The village is located on the Rat River (a right tributary of the Seym), 105 km from the Russia–Ukraine border, 13 km east of the district center – the town Kursk.

 Streets
There is Solovyinaya street and 438 houses.

 Climate
Besedino has a warm-summer humid continental climate (Dfb in the Köppen climate classification).

Transport 
Besedino is located on the federal route  (Kursk – Voronezh –  "Kaspy" Highway; a part of the European route ), on the road of regional importance  (R-298 – Polevaya), on the road of intermunicipal significance  (R-298 – Belomestnoye – Kuvshinnoye), 8.5 km from the nearest railway halt Zaplava (railway line Klyukva — Belgorod).

The rural locality is situated 15 km from Kursk Vostochny Airport, 117 km from Belgorod International Airport and 190 km from Voronezh Peter the Great Airport.

References

Notes

Sources

Rural localities in Kursky District, Kursk Oblast